Senator Fogarty may refer to:

Charles J. Fogarty (born 1955), Rhode Island State Senate
Paul Fogarty (born 1957), Rhode Island State Senate